Prisoners of the Earth, also known as Prisoners of the Land, (Spanish: Prisioneros de la tierra) is a 1939 Argentine drama film directed by Mario Soffici. The film premiered in Buenos Aires. The film is often cited as one of the greatest in the history of Argentine cinema, and established Soffici as a "social" filmmaker. It was awarded by the Municipality of Buenos Aires as the best film of the year, and the Silver Condor Award instituted by the Argentine Association of Film Critics.

It was selected as the greatest Argentine film of all time in the polls conducted by the Museo del Cine Pablo Ducrós Hicken in 1977 and 1984, while it ranked 6th in the 2000 edition. In a new version of the survey organized in 2022 by the specialized magazines La vida util, Taipei and La tierra quema, presented at the Mar del Plata International Film Festival, the film reached the 19th position.

Cast
Homero Cárpena
Raúl De Lange
Roberto Fugazot
Elisa Galvé as Andrea
Ángel Magaña as Esteban Podeley
Pepito Petray
Francisco Petrone as Köhner
Félix Tortorelli
Manuel Villoldo

Restoration
In 2019, the Museo del Cine of Argentina, with the support of Martin Scorsese's The Film Foundation and the laboratory of the Cineteca di Bologna, restored "Prisoners of the Land" from two 35mm prints of the film found both in Paris at the Cinémathèque Française and in Prague at the Czech Film Archive. The discovery of this two prints was crucial, due to the lack of a national cinematheque and protective cultural politics the original argentine negative was lost during the last century, and the only copy left in the country was a degraded 16mm. Paula Felix-Didier, head of the Museo del Cine and principal responsibility of the restoration, said about the significance of this new copy: "This is a new possibility of seeing one of the fundamental films of the history of Argentine cinema again as it had been decades ago could not be seen, and once again having a deep heritage rescue to understand the history of Argentine cinema and its evolution".

This 2019 restoration was first shown at the Il Cinema Ritrovato Festival in Bologna and later, in December, it was first screened in Argentina at the MALBA, in Buenos Aires.

References

Further reading
Tomas Abraham article about Soffici

External links

1939 drama films
1939 films
Argentine black-and-white films
Argentine drama films
Films directed by Mario Soffici
1930s Spanish-language films